Rafael Michael Anchía (born September 26, 1968) has been since 2005 a Democratic member of the Texas House of Representatives for the Dallas-based 103rd District. In addition to his representative work, Anchia is an attorney with the law firm Haynes & Boone LLP and co-founder and Managing Director of Civitas Capital Group. He had previously served on the board of the Dallas Independent School District.

Anchia currently sits on the board of the interest group, Education Is Freedom. He is also a member of the Texas State Democratic Executive Committee and was a superdelegate to the 2016 Democratic National Convention.

Early life and education 

Born and reared in Miami, Florida, Anchia is one of two children born to parents who emigrated to the United States. His father, Julio Anchia, is from the Basque region of Spain. His mother, Edurne Anchia, was born and reared in Mexico City, Querétaro, and Acapulco.

Anchia's grandfather, Claudio, was a sheep and goat herder in the province of Viscaya, Spain. In the early 1900s, he traveled to Idaho, as did legions of other Basques, to herd sheep. Despite not being a citizen of the United States, Claudio signed up to fight for the United States in World War I. The Anchias were on the losing Republican faction side in the Spanish Civil War in which Generalissimo Francisco Franco emerged victorious. Many Basques experienced hardship in the Franco tenure. Julio Anchia left his home town at the age of fifteen to earn money for the family and came to the United States at the age of nineteen.

Anchia's mother was the daughter of a well-known engraver, Justino Michelena; he was an engraver of handguns and rifles, which led to a job offer from Colt's Manufacturing Company, an American firearms manufacturer. At the age of fifteen years old, she migrated with her family to the United States. She graduated from Miami High School. Julio and Edurne met in Miami, and after a long courtship, the couple married in 1967. Representative Anchia was born the following year, 1968.

Anchia lived in Miami as a child, where he attended and graduated from Miami Coral Park Senior High School in 1986. Upon graduation, he enrolled at Southern Methodist University in Dallas, at which he triple majored in Spanish, Latin American studies, and Anthropology and graduated with Honors. Anchia continued his studies and earned his Juris Doctor degree from Tulane University Law School in New Orleans, Louisiana.

During his legislative advocacy class, he worked on legislation that ultimately became law creating a statewide ombudsperson to monitor conditions in Louisiana nursing homes. Anchia also served as a volunteer advocate for immigrant detainees who were denied the benefit of counsel.

Rafael and his wife, Marissa, have two daughters, Sofia and Maia.

DISD Board of Trustees 
In 2001, at the age of thirty-two, Anchia was elected as the District 7 trustee of the Dallas Independent School District, then the nation's 12th largest school district. During his tenure on the school board, Anchia served as first vice president and chaired the Policy and Governance Committee. As a trustee, he helped lead the successful effort of the Dallas ISD to win public approval of a $1.37 billion school bond package.

Anchia helped lead an effort to ensure that teachers received two 4 percent consecutive pay increases without raising taxes. The board was also committed to reduce waste and to create a more efficient school district. More than a hundred administrative positions ended. This decision helped to guarantee the salary increases promised to DISD teachers. Starting salaries were the highest in the DFW metroplex. The following year marked the first academic school year in two decades where the school district began with no teacher vacancies—a number that had reached two thousand at the beginning of Anchia's term.

Texas House of Representatives 
Anchia was elected to the Texas House in 2004 and sworn into the freshman class of the 79th Texas Legislature on January 11, 2005.  The district Anchia represents is fully encompassed within Dallas County, Texas, and includes North Oak Cliff, Oak Lawn, portions of West Dallas, the Medical District, Love Field Airport, North and Arlington Parks, Irving, and Farmers Branch. As of 2015, he was 35th in seniority out of the 150 members of the Texas House.

Anchia currently serves as the Chairman of the House Committee on Pensions, Investments, and Financial Services. He also serves as a member of the Energy Resources Committee and the Redistricting Committee.

In previous sessions, Anchia served as vice-chair of the Pensions, Investments and Financial Services Committee and sat on the Economic Development, Elections, Financial Institutions, Land & Resource Management, Local & Consent Calendar, and Urban Affairs Committees.

Anchia is a supporter of "New Urbanism" and finding a balance between fossil fuels and renewable energy.

References

1968 births
Living people
21st-century American politicians
American politicians of Mexican descent
American people of Spanish descent
Hispanic and Latino American state legislators in Texas
Democratic Party members of the Texas House of Representatives
Southern Methodist University alumni
Texas lawyers
Tulane University Law School alumni
American people of Basque descent